Felice Rahel Schragenheim (9 March 1922 – 31 December 1944) was a Jewish resistance fighter during World War II. She is known for her tragic love story with Lilly Wust. She was murdered via a death march from Gross-Rosen concentration camp (today Poland) to Bergen-Belsen concentration camp in Germany or, not later than, March 1945 in Bergen-Belsen.

The story of the relationship between Schragenheim and Wust is portrayed in the 1999 film Aimée & Jaguar, and in a book of the same name by Erica Fischer.  It is also the subject of the 1997 documentary Love Story: Berlin 1942.

Schragenheim was deported from Berlin to KZ Theresienstadt (now Czech Republic) on 8 September 1944 by the Nazi Gestapo secret police (transport nr. I/116). On 9 October 1944, she was deported from Theresienstadt to the extermination facility KZ Auschwitz Birkenau to be murdered (transport nr. Ep). As the gas chambers and crematoria were dismantled and blown up between November 1944 and January 1945, the mass extermination in Auschwitz came to an end, gradually. The inmates, including Felice Schragenheim, were taken on a death march to KZ Groß-Rosen, maybe later to a death march to KZ Bergen-Belsen. The date and place of her death are unknown. Officially, the date of her death was defined as 31 December 1944 by a Berlin court in 1948. Relatives set a memorial stone in Bergen-Belsen, naming "March 1945" as the date of her death.

Formative years
According to Yad Vashem, which has based its profile of Felice Schragenheim on data presented in the German Federal Archives publication, "The Memorial Book of the Federal Archives for the Victims of the Persecution of Jews in Germany (1933-1945)," Schragenheim was born in Berlin, Germany on 9 March 1922.

World War II
Employed during her early 20s as an editorial assistant by a Berlin-based publishing company which was sympathetic to the Nazi regime, Felice Schragenheim joined the German resistance to Nazism.

Facing increased scrutiny by Nazi officials for her resistance work in 1942, Schragenheim was introduced by an acquaintance, who was employed as a housekeeper in the Berlin household of Günther Wust, a Nazi soldier, to Wust's wife, Charlotte Elisabeth "Lilly" Wust, who was residing in Berlin-Schmargendorf with her four children while her husband was away at war. Initially introduced by her alias "Felice Schröder," she eventually grew close enough to Wust to confide in her. Telling Wust her true name and revealing her history as a Jewish member of the German Resistance, Schragenheim soon fell in love.

Their courtship was traditional, according to Kate Connolly, the Berlin correspondent for The Guardian US at the time of her 2001 interview of Lilly Wust. After their introduction, Schragenheim "would come to tea at Lilly's almost daily, bringing flowers and poems. In between, the two would write to each other." When Wust was hospitalized with dental sepsis in March 1943, Schragenheim "brought red roses every day.... On March 25, the two became 'engaged', signing written declarations of their love, which they sealed with a marriage contract three months later."

The couple had begun living together at Wust's home in Berlin after Wust legally separated from her husband in 1942; they remained a couple until July 1944 when Schragenheim was reported to Nazi officials and captured by the Gestapo. Arrested at the home she shared with Wust, Schragenheim was taken to the Schulstrasse transit camp in Berlin; held there until 4 September 1944, she was subsequently deported to the Theresienstadt concentration camp in Czechoslovakia. Despite the danger, Wust made repeated visits to, and exchanged love letters with, Schragenheim at Schulstrasse. Schragenheim also was inspired to write a love poem for Wust.

While Schragenheim was imprisoned at Theresienstadt, Wust attempted to arrange a visit, but was refused by the camp's commandant. Before the couple could reunite, Schragenheim was deported to the Auschwitz concentration camp. Sent on one or two death marches in December 1944, according to various historical accounts (one from Auschwitz to the Gross-Rosen concentration camp and the other from Gross-Rosen to the Bergen-Belsen concentration camp), Schragenheim is believed to have died on New Year's Eve (31 December 1944), according to historians at Yad Vashem. Although her exact fate was never able to be determined, a Berlin court issued a ruling in 1948 which set her death date as 31 December 1944.

Memorials  
 Elisabeth Wust went on to survive Felice Schragenheim by more than sixty years. After her death on 31 March 2006 and subsequent burial at Dorfkirche Giesensdorf (the cemetery of the Giesensdorf village church), in Lichterfelde (Berlin), Germany, a headstone memorializing her relationship with Schragenheim was placed on her grave.

Schragenheim's relatives also established a memorial for her, placing a memorial stone at the site of the former Bergen-Belsen concentration camp; this marker notes that Schragenheim's death occurred in March 1945.

Legacy
During the early to mid-1990s, Lilly Wust sold the rights to the story of her love affair with Felice Schragenheim to Austrian journalist Erica Fischer, who studied Schragenheim's poetry and the couple's letters, researched the couple's lives further, and then wrote the 1994 book, Aimée & Jaguar: A Love Story, Berlin 1943, which was then adapted for the screen, becoming the 1999 film, Aimée & Jaguar. As of 2018, Fischer's book had been translated into 20 languages.

Interviewed in 2001, the 89-year-old Wust recalled:

It was the tenderest love you could imagine.... I was fairly experienced with men, but with Felice I reached a far deeper under-standing of sex than ever before....There was an immediate attraction, and we flirted outrageously.... I began to feel alive as I never had before....She was my other half, literally my reflection, my mirror image, and for the first time I found love aesthetically beautiful, and so tender....Twice since she left, I've felt her breath, and a warm presence next to me. I dream that we will meet again - I live in hope.

References

External links

 Collections of the Jewish Museum Berlin: "Felice Schragenheim"
 "Felice Felicitas Rachel Schragenheim," in "The Central Database of Shoah Victims' Names." Jerusalem, Israel: Yad Vashem, retrieved online 30 June 2018.
 Felice Schragenheim (also known as "Felice Schröder"), in "Wust, Elisabeth," in "The Righteous Among the Nations." Jerusalem, Israel: Yad Vashem, retrieved online 30 June 2018.
 "Schragenheim, Felice Felicitas Rachel" in The Memorial Book of the Federal Archives for the Victims of the Persecution of Jews in Germany (1933-1945). Koblenz, German: Das Bundesarchiv (German Federal Archives), retrieved online 30 June 2018.

1922 births
1944 deaths
German people who died in Bergen-Belsen concentration camp
Female resistance members of World War II
Jews in the German resistance
Lesbian Jews
German lesbians
Resistance members who died in Nazi concentration camps
German Jews who died in the Holocaust
20th-century German LGBT people